The 2015 Channel One Cup was played between 17–20 December 2015. The Czech Republic, Finland, Sweden and Russia played a round-robin for a total of three games per team and six games in total. Five of the matches were played in the VTB Ice Palace in Moscow, Russia, and one match in the O2 Arena in Prague, Czech Republic. The tournament was part of 2015–16 Euro Hockey Tour. Tournament was won by Czech Republic before Sweden, Finland and Russia.

Standings

Games
All times are local.
Moscow – (Moscow Time – UTC+3) Prague – (Central European Time – UTC+1)

Gallery

References

Channel
Channel
Channel
Channel
Channel
Channel One Cup (ice hockey)
December 2015 sports events in Russia
December 2015 sports events in Europe
2015 in Moscow
Channel One Cup
Sports competitions in Prague